Astragalus racemosus, the cream milkvetch, is a species of flowering plant in the family Fabaceae. It is native to central North America. A selenium hyperaccumulator, it is considered capable of poisoning livestock as one of the locoweeds.

Subtaxa
The following varieties are accepted:
Astragalus racemosus var. longisetus  – Colorado, Idaho, Montana, Nebraska, New Mexico, South Dakota, Wyoming, Québec
Astragalus racemosus var. racemosus – Saskatchewan, Colorado, Kansas, Minnesota, Nebraska, New Mexico, North Dakota, Oklahoma, South Dakota, Texas, Wyoming, Mexico Northeast
Astragalus racemosus var. treleasei  – Colorado, Utah, Wyoming

References

racemosus
Flora of Saskatchewan
Flora of Quebec
Flora of Idaho
Flora of Montana
Flora of Wyoming
Flora of Colorado
Flora of North Dakota
Flora of South Dakota
Flora of Nebraska
Flora of Kansas
Flora of Oklahoma
Flora of Minnesota
Flora of Utah
Flora of the South-Central United States
Flora of Northeastern Mexico
Plants described in 1813
Flora without expected TNC conservation status